This album was the soundtrack for a traveling independent film and has the distinction of containing the first official release from Crooked Fingers, Sleep for Sale. This compilation was released by Arena Rock Recording Co. in 1997 and is now out of print.

Track listing 
 Mitch Mitchell's Terrifying Experience "Get Out Of My World"
 Haywood "Newbie Zimbo"
 Muler "Caesars Palace"
 Helium "Honeycomb"
 Longstocking "Teenage Angst At 27"
 Flesh Vehicle "Perfect State Of Grace"
 Harvey Danger "Carjack Fever"
 Purple Ivy Shadows "Just As Soon"
 Home "Chicago Demonstration"
 Pat Irwin "Sam's Wild Thing"
 Semi-Gloss "Stephanie's Boy"
 Illyah Kuryahkin "Sundial"
 Marble Valley "Weezer West"
 Elf Power "Temporary Arm"
 Cagney & Lacey "Time"
 Varnaline "lbs."
 The Softies "Count To Ten"
 Super 5 Thor "Century Girl"
 Underwater Salvage Partners "Rudy"
 Crooked Fingers "Sleep For Sale"

External links
Arena Rock Recording Co.

1997 compilation albums
Film soundtracks
1997 soundtrack albums
Arena Rock Recording Company soundtracks